Chadwick House is one of three neighbouring houses built by architect Harold Desbrowe-Annear.  At the time of purchase, the allotment location was on the rural urban fringe of Melbourne. It was sloping and provided extensive views over the Yarra Valley.  The house was built in 1904 and had many modifications both internally and externally from then until 1988 when it was purchased by architect, Peter Crone. He subsequently undertook a ten-year restoration to return the house, as far as possible and with limited information, to its original condition.
The three houses are all domestic dwellings, modest in size and built in an era when extensive architectural work was being done on public buildings and mansions.  Chadwick House and the two neighbouring houses epitomise the Arts and Crafts Movement of which Desbrowe-Annear was an exponent and are especially notable as a trio.  The house incorporated a number of design and technological innovations not the least of which was the open plan of the interior which still plays a significant role in the design of homes today.

Description
Chadwick House is found at 32-34 the Eyrie in Eaglemont, Melbourne.  The house is one of three houses which were built on land purchased by Desbrowe-Annear‘s father-in-law and the houses are still found today on The Eyrie and adjoining Outlook Drive. The two other houses of very similar design built by Desbrowe-Annear.  The three houses were sited to take advantage of the vista, ventilation, sunshine and a ‘healthy atmosphere’ which were considered important to the design.  Each of the houses is sited increasingly further back from the street so as not to block the view of the other.

One of the most striking features of Chadwick House is the two verandas facing east and south-east overlooking the garden.  The verandas have an unusual double ox-bow balustrading. The tiled roof is a collection of gabled and hip roofs.  The lower part of the house is clad with double beveled weatherboards while the upper part comprises rough cast panels separated by vertical timbers and this pattern is extended to the gables.  The house exhibits many technological innovations including wall recessed, sliding window sashes, modular wall-framing and convection heating vents to the fireplaces.  The large timber door which slides to conceal the front dining room is further evidence of the technical innovation employed in the house.  The house has a balloon frame construction which was introduced to Australia from California in the mid-nineteenth century.  The weatherboards and timber are charcoal grey, the veranda balustrades are yellow and the panels of rough cast are orange/ochre in colour. 
The interior is an open plan design which at the time was a radical departure from contemporary designs.  There is no extended hallway but rather a small entrance hall from which the main living areas are accessed.  From these rooms there is access to the kitchen and bedrooms.  The sloping site allowed two rooms to be built under the main house.  Their initial use was as office space for Desbrowe-Annear.  Much of the interior comprises dark stained timber with a raked timber lined ceiling and built-in joinery.  Until 1988 much of the original timber work was lost under layers of paint and plaster or had been removed.  The renovations took place over a ten-year period and endeavoured to restore the building to its original condition.  In some cases appropriate timber had to be sourced to replace and repair the initial ‘improvements’.

Key Influences and Design Approach
Chadwick house reflects both the tenets of Gothic Revival Functionalism based in part of the writings of A.W.N. Pugin and the Arts and Crafts Movement.  Chadwick house demonstrates the principles of William Morris in its material and structural honesty, awareness of functionalism and site and appreciation of fine craftsmanship. ‘Have nothing in your house that you do not know to be useful and believe to be beautiful.’

Awards
Chadwick house is registered by Heritage Victoria and classified by the National Trust in a group classification that includes the houses and their sites, together with the landscape of The Eyrie from The Panorama to Outlook Drive.  In 2008 the house won the Australian Institute of Architects Victorian Chapter John George Knight Award for Heritage and an Australian Institute of Architects National Award for Heritage.

References

2. Goad, Philip; Melbourne Architecture, The Watermark Press, Boorowa, NSW, 2009, p91

External links
 
 http://www.architecturemedia.com/aa/aaissue.php?issueid=200905&article=13&typeon=2
 https://web.archive.org/web/20160303211819/http://www.onmydoorstep.com.au/heritage-listing/2080/chadwick-house
 http://federation-house.wikispaces.com/Federation+Arts+and+Crafts+Architect
 http://adb.anu.edu.au/biography/annear-harold-desbrowe-5036
 http://vhd.heritage.vic.gov.au/#detail_places;66525

Houses in Melbourne
Heritage-listed buildings in Melbourne
Buildings and structures in the City of Banyule
1904 establishments in Australia
Houses completed in 1904